Leopoldo Torricelli (2 February 1893 – 18 November 1930) was an Italian racing cyclist. He won the 1916 edition of the Giro di Lombardia.

References

External links
 

1893 births
1930 deaths
Italian male cyclists
Cyclists from Turin